Pallas (minor-planet designation: 2 Pallas) is the second asteroid to have been discovered, after Ceres. It is believed to have a mineral composition similar to carbonaceous chondrite meteorites, like Ceres, though significantly less hydrated than Ceres. It is the third-largest asteroid in the Solar System by both volume and mass, and is a likely remnant protoplanet. It is 79% the mass of Vesta and 22% the mass of Ceres, constituting an estimated 7% of the mass of the asteroid belt. Its estimated volume is equivalent to a sphere  in diameter, 90–95% the volume of Vesta.

During the planetary formation era of the Solar System, objects grew in size through an accretion process to approximately the size of Pallas. Most of these protoplanets were incorporated into the growth of larger bodies, which became the planets, whereas others were ejected by the planets or destroyed in collisions with each other. Pallas, Vesta and Ceres appear to be the only intact bodies from this early stage of planetary formation to survive within the orbit of Neptune.

When Pallas was discovered by the German astronomer Heinrich Wilhelm Matthäus Olbers on 28 March 1802, it was considered to be a planet, as were other asteroids in the early 19th century. The discovery of many more asteroids after 1845 eventually led to the separate listing of "minor" planets from "major" planets, and the realization in the 1950s that such small bodies did not form in the same way as (other) planets led to the gradual abandonment of the term "minor planet" in favor of "asteroid" (or, for larger bodies such as Pallas, "planetoid").

With an orbital inclination of 34.8°, Pallas's orbit is unusually highly inclined to the plane of the asteroid belt, making Pallas relatively inaccessible to spacecraft, and its orbital eccentricity is nearly as large as that of Pluto.

The high inclination of the orbit of Pallas results in the possibility of close conjunctions to stars that other solar objects always pass at great angular distance. So Pallas passes Sirius on 9 October 2022, 8.5 arcminutes southwards,  while no planet can get closer than 30 degrees to Sirius.

History

Discovery 
On the night of 5 April 1779, Charles Messier recorded Pallas on a star chart he used to track the path of a comet, now known as C/1779 A1 (Bode), that he observed in the spring of 1779, but apparently assumed it was nothing more than a star.

In 1801, the astronomer Giuseppe Piazzi discovered an object which he initially believed to be a comet. Shortly thereafter he announced his observations of this object, noting that the slow, uniform motion was uncharacteristic of a comet, suggesting it was a different type of object. This was lost from sight for several months, but was recovered later that year by the Baron von Zach and Heinrich W. M. Olbers after a preliminary orbit was computed by Carl Friedrich Gauss. This object came to be named Ceres, and was the first asteroid to be discovered.

A few months later, Olbers was again attempting to locate Ceres when he noticed another moving object in the vicinity. This was the asteroid Pallas, coincidentally passing near Ceres at the time. The discovery of this object created interest in the astronomy community. Before this point it had been speculated by astronomers that there should be a planet in the gap between Mars and Jupiter. Now, unexpectedly, a second such body had been found. When Pallas was discovered, some estimates of its size were as high as 3,380 km in diameter. Even as recently as 1979, Pallas was estimated to be 673 km in diameter, 26% greater than the currently accepted value.

The orbit of Pallas was determined by Gauss, who found the period of 4.6 years was similar to the period for Ceres. Pallas has a relatively high orbital inclination to the plane of the ecliptic.

Later observations 

In 1917, the Japanese astronomer Kiyotsugu Hirayama began to study asteroid motions. By plotting the mean orbital motion, inclination, and eccentricity of a set of asteroids, he discovered several distinct groupings. In a later paper he reported a group of three asteroids associated with Pallas, which became named the Pallas family, after the largest member of the group. Since 1994 more than 10 members of this family have been identified, with semi-major axes between 2.50 and 2.82 AU and inclinations of 33–38°. The validity of the family was confirmed in 2002 by a comparison of their spectra.

Pallas has been observed occulting stars several times, including the best-observed of all asteroid occultation events, by 140 observers on 29 May 1983. These measurements resulted in the first accurate calculation of its diameter.
After an occultation on 29 May 1979, the discovery of a possible tiny satellite with a diameter of about 1  km was reported, which was never confirmed.

Radio signals from spacecraft in orbit around Mars and/or on its surface have been used to estimate the mass of Pallas from the tiny perturbations induced by it onto the motion of Mars.

The Dawn team was granted viewing time on the Hubble Space Telescope in September 2007 for a once-in-twenty-year opportunity to view Pallas at closest approach, to obtain comparative data for Ceres and Vesta.

Name and symbol 
'Pallas' is an epithet ofthe Greek goddess Athena. In some versions of the myth, Athena killed Pallas, daughter of Triton, then adopted her friend's name out of mourning.

The adjectival form of the name is Palladian. The d is part of the oblique stem of the Greek name, which appears before a vowel but disappears before the nominative ending -s.
The stony-iron pallasite meteorites are not Palladian, being named instead after the German naturalist Peter Simon Pallas. The chemical element palladium, on the other hand, was named after the asteroid, which had been discovered just before the element.

The blade was most often a lozenge, but various graphic variants were published, including an acute/elliptic leaf shape, a cordate leaf shape, and a triangle; the last made it effectively the alchemical symbol for sulfur, . 
The generic asteroid symbol of a disk with its discovery number, was introduced in 1852 and quickly became the norm. The iconic lozenge symbol was resurrected for astrological use in 1973.

Orbit and rotation 

Pallas has unusual dynamic parameters for such a large body. Its orbit is highly inclined and moderately eccentric, despite being at the same distance from the Sun as the central part of the asteroid belt. Furthermore, Pallas has a very high axial tilt of 84°, with its north pole pointing towards ecliptic coordinates (β, λ) = (30°, −16°) with a 5° uncertainty in the Ecliptic J2000.0 reference frame. This means that every Palladian summer and winter, large parts of the surface are in constant sunlight or constant darkness for a time on the order of an Earth year, with areas near the poles experiencing continuous sunlight for as long as two years.

Near resonances 
Pallas is in a, likely coincidental, near-1:1 orbital resonance with Ceres. Pallas also has a near-18:7 resonance (91,000-year period) and an approximate 5:2 resonance (83-year period) with Jupiter.

Transits of planets from Pallas 
From Pallas, the planets Mercury, Venus, Mars, and Earth can occasionally appear to transit, or pass in front of, the Sun. Earth last did so in 1968 and 1998, and will next transit in 2224. Mercury did in October 2009. The last and next by Venus are in 1677 and 2123, and for Mars they are in 1597 and 2759.

Physical characteristics 

Both Vesta and Pallas have assumed the title of second-largest asteroid from time to time. At  in diameter, Pallas is slightly smaller than Vesta. The mass of Pallas is  that of Vesta,  that of Ceres, and a quarter of one percent that of the Moon.

Pallas is farther from Earth and has a much lower albedo than Vesta, and hence is dimmer as seen from Earth. Indeed, the much smaller asteroid 7 Iris marginally exceeds Pallas in mean opposition magnitude. Pallas's mean opposition magnitude is +8.0, which is well within the range of 10×50 binoculars, but, unlike Ceres and Vesta, it will require more-powerful optical aid to view at small elongations, when its magnitude can drop as low as +10.6. During rare perihelic oppositions, Pallas can reach a magnitude of +6.4, right on the edge of naked-eye visibility. During late February 2014 Pallas shone with magnitude 6.96.

Pallas is a B-type asteroid. Based on spectroscopic observations, the primary component of the material on Pallas's surface is a silicate containing little iron and water. Minerals of this type include olivine and pyroxene, which are found in CM chondrules. The surface composition of Pallas is very similar to the Renazzo carbonaceous chondrite (CR) meteorites, which are even lower in hydrous minerals than the CM type. The Renazzo meteorite was discovered in Italy in 1824 and is one of the most primitive meteorites known. [update—Marsset 2020 finds it closer to CM meteorites] Pallas's visible and near-infrared spectrum is almost flat, being slightly brighter in towards the blue. There is only one clear absorption band in the 3-micron part, which suggests an anhydrous component mixed with hydrated CM-like silicates.

Pallas's surface is most likely composed of a silicate material; its spectrum and calculated density correspond to CM chondrite meteorites, suggesting a mineral composition similar to that of Ceres, but significantly less hydrated.

To within observational limits, Pallas appears to be saturated with craters. Its high inclination and eccentricity means that average impacts are much more energetic than on Vesta or Ceres (with on average twice their velocity), meaning that smaller (and thus more common) impactors can create equivalently sized craters. Indeed, Pallas appears to have many more large craters than either Vesta or Ceres, with craters larger than 40 km covering at least 9% of its surface.

Pallas' shape departs significantly from the dimensions of an equilibrium body at its current rotational period, indicating that it is not a dwarf planet. It's possible that a suspected large impact basin at the south pole, which ejected  of the volume of Pallas (twice the volume of the Rheasilvia basin on Vesta), may have increased its inclination and slowed its rotation; the shape of Pallas without such a basin would be close to an equilibrium shape for a 6.2-hour rotational period. A smaller crater near the equator is associated with the Palladian family of asteroids.

Pallas probably has a quite homogeneous interior. The close match between Pallas and CM chondrites suggests that they formed in the same era and that the interior of Pallas never reached the temperature (≈820 K) needed to dehydrate silicates, which would be necessary to differentiate a dry silicate core beneath a hydrated mantle. Thus Pallas should be rather homogeneous in composition, though some upward flow of water could have occurred since. Such a migration of water to the surface would have left salt deposits, potentially explaining Pallas's relatively high albedo. Indeed, one bright spot is reminiscent of those found on Ceres. Although other explanations for the bright spot are possible (e.g. a recent ejecta blanket), if the near-Earth asteroid 3200 Phaethon is an ejected piece of Pallas, as some have theorized, then a Palladian surface enriched in salts would explain the sodium abundance in the Geminid meteor shower caused by Phaethon.

Surface features
Besides one bright spot in the southern hemisphere, the only surface features identified on Pallas are craters. As of 2020, 36 craters have been identified, 34 of which are larger than 40 km in diameter. Provisional names have been provided for some of them. The craters are named after ancient weapons.

Satellites 
A small moon about 1 kilometer in diameter was suggested based on occultation data from 29 May 1978. In 1980, speckle interferometry suggested a much larger satellite, whose existence was later refuted a few years later with occultation data.

Exploration 
Pallas itself has never been visited by spacecraft. Proposals have been made in the past though none have come to fruition.   A flyby of the Dawn probe's visits to 4 Vesta and 1 Ceres was discussed but was not possible due to the high orbital inclination of Pallas. The proposed Athena SmallSat mission would have been launched in 2022 as a secondary payload of the Psyche mission and travel on separate trajectory to a flyby encounter with 2 Pallas, though was not funded due to being outcompeted by other mission concepts such as the  Transorbital Trailblazer Lunar Orbiter. The authors of the proposal cited Pallas as the "largest unexplored" protoplanet with the main belt.

Gallery

See also 

 Objects formerly considered planets

Notes

References

External links 

 Pallas at Encyclopædia Britannica, Edward F. Tedesco
 
 
 
 
 
 
 
 

000002
Discoveries by Heinrich Olbers
Named minor planets
000002
000002
000002
000002
18020328
18020328